The 2011–12 UCI Oceania Tour was the eighth season of the UCI Oceania Tour. The season began on 12 October 2011 with the Herald Sun Tour and ended on 18 March 2012 with the Oceania Cycling Championships.

The points leader, based on the cumulative results of previous races, wears the UCI Oceania Tour cycling jersey. Richard Lang of Australia was the defending champion of the 2011 UCI Oceania Tour. Paul Odlin of New Zealand was crowned as the 2011–12 UCI Oceania Tour champion.

Throughout the season, points are awarded to the top finishers of stages within stage races and the final general classification standings of each of the stages races and one-day events. The quality and complexity of a race also determines how many points are awarded to the top finishers, the higher the UCI rating of a race, the more points are awarded.
The UCI ratings from highest to lowest are as follows:
 Multi-day events: 2.HC, 2.1 and 2.2
 One-day events: 1.HC, 1.1 and 1.2

Events

2011

2012

Final standings

Individual classification

Team classification

Nation classification

Nation under-23 classification

External links
 

UCI Oceania Tour

2012 in Oceanian sport
2011 in Oceanian sport